Homeobox protein Hox-B1 is a protein that in humans is encoded by the HOXB1 gene.

Function 

This gene belongs to the homeobox family of genes. The homeobox genes encode a highly conserved family of transcription factors that play an important role in morphogenesis in all multicellular organisms. Mammals possess four similar homeobox gene clusters, HOXA, HOXB, HOXC and HOXD, located on different chromosomes, consisting of 9 to 11 genes arranged in tandem. This gene is one of several homeobox HOXB genes located in a cluster on chromosome 17.

Interactions 

HOXB1 has been shown to interact with PBX1.

See also 
 Homeobox

References

Further reading

External links 
 
 

Transcription factors